Viktor Engelbrekt Hackberg (August 13, 1891 – November 5, 1968) was a Swedish track and field athlete who competed in the 1912 Summer Olympics. In 1912 Hackberg finished 13th in the hammer throw competition. He also participated in the decathlon competition but retired after three events.

References

External links
Profile

 1891 births
 1968 deaths
 Swedish male hammer throwers
 Swedish decathletes
 Olympic athletes of Sweden
 Athletes (track and field) at the 1912 Summer Olympics
 Olympic decathletes